Cristina Velasco Lozano (Tijuana, Mexico 1979), is a Mexican film producer, and a cofounder of Paloma Negra Films, a Mexican independent production company.

She started in cinema as the production coordinator of the feature film “Norteado” by Rigoberto Perezcano, the most awarded Mexican film of 2009. She later coordinated the production of “Morir de pié” by Jacaranda Correa, winner of best documentary at FIC Guadalajara.

Since then she has produced many works including: Granicero a documentary by Gustavo Gamou in 2011, Tijuana sonido del Nortec, by Alberto Cortés, The Naked Room by Nuria Ibáñez, winner of best documentary at the 2013 Morelia International Film Festival. 

Cristina also produced Carmín Tropical by Rigoberto Perezcano, winner in Morelia 2015 and other international awards.

She is the producer of Eisenstein in Guanajuato by Peter Greenaway, premiered in competition at the 2015 Berlinale and sold in more than 20 countries. She is co-producer of Los Herederos by Jorge Hernandez Aldana and produced by Lucia Films.

In 2015, Cristina joined the Mexican Film Institute, IMCINE, as Director of Production. She was in charge of the FOPROCINE fund and the National Film Commission. A couple of years later, she directed EFICINE, a fiscal incentive for Mexican film production.

In 2018, she produced the documentary El Reino de la Sirena by Luis Rincón, which had its launch at the prestigious documentary festival, Dok Leipzig in Germany, it later showed at FICUNAM, the 2018 Ambulante Documentary Tour, among other festivals.

In 2019, she produced New Order by Michel Franco, winner of the Grand Jury Prize at the Venice Film Festival and was in the first place at the box office in Mexico for several weeks. That same year she completed the production of El Gran Fellove directed by actor and director Matt Dillon, which premiered at the San Sebastian Film Festival.

She produced for Teorema, the film Sundown by Michel Franco, which premiered in competition at the 2021 Biennale di Venezia, starring Tim Roth and Charlotte Gainsbourg. She is also the producer of Los Amantes se despiden con la mirada by Rigoberto Perezcano and Bengino Cruz by Jorge Hernandez Aldana, which will premiere soon.

Filmography
 Northless, 2009, supervising
 Granicero, 2011
 Tijuana, sonidos del Nortec, 2012, line
 El Cuarto Desnudo, 2013
 Carmin Tropical, 2014
 Eisenstein in Guanajuato, 2015
 The Heirs, 2015, co-producer
 The Mermaid Kingdom, 2017
 New Order, 2020
 The Great Fellove, 2020

References

Mexican film producers